Chèo (Chữ Nôm: 嘲) is a form of generally satirical musical theatre, often encompassing dance, traditionally performed by Vietnamese peasants in northern Vietnam. It is usually performed outdoors by semi-amateur touring groups, stereo-typically in a village square or the courtyard of a public building, although it is today increasingly also performed indoors and by professional performers. Chèo stage art is one of the great cultural heritage of the Vietnamese folk treasure. Chèo has been a popular art form of the Vietnamese people for many generations and has fostered the national spirit through its lyrical content.

Hát chèos origins date to the 12th century during the Lý dynasty and has existed in its present form since roughly the 16th century. It derives from folk traditions, and was orally transmitted; unlike courtly theater traditions, it employs no scenery and sparse costumes and makeup. It involves a combination of traditional set pieces and improvisational routines appropriate to amateur theatre. Like the Commedia dell'arte, it often carries a message of satirical criticism of the existing social order. The traditional musical ensemble consisted of the đàn nguyệt, sáo, and the drum, though in modern recreations, more instruments are used.

A scene featuring hát chèo may be seen in the 2002 Vietnamese film Mê Thảo, Thời Vang Bóng (The Glorious Time in Mê Thảo Hamlet), directed by Việt Linh.

History
Hoa Lư – Ninh Bình is considered as the homeland of the Chèo, and its founder, Phạm Thị Trân, was a talented dancer in the royal palace during the Đinh dynasty of the tenth century. However, Chèo officially appears from the Lý dynasty (around the 11th century), flourished in the Trần dynasty (13th century). The development of Chèo has its origins when a Mongolian soldier was captured in Vietnam in the 14th century. Chèo's performance only included speaking and reciting folk songs prior to this period but influenced by the captured soldier, Chèo now is sung. In the 15th century, Emperor Lê Thánh Tông did not allow Chèo to be performed in the royal court. Chèo was only performed by peasants as a usual musical entertainment activity up to the present-day in the villages.

Chèo derives from folk music and dance, especially parody since the tenth century. Gradually, people developed various short stories based on these parodies into the longer, completed plays.

From loyal area's performance only, Chèo has been expanded to the North Delta and the North Central Coast ( to Nghe An province) and the Red River delta is the cradle of Vietnamese rice civilization. Whenever the crop is harvested, they organize festivals to entertain and thank the Gods for the harvest. From the first millennium BC, ancestors performed the first Chèo in the communal house yard in their village.

Characteristics

General features
Chèo belongs to the genre of drama, with ancillary music including rhythmical music, evocative music, background music, and dance music. Hát chèo's is the stage singing, it can be sung by one person or many people on chorus. The melody of the Chèo tune is very suitable for the Vietnamese natural voice language. Hát chèo's is derived from folk melodies, the lyrics of Chèo are derived from folk-literary works in the Northern Delta.

Chèo stage is an integrated art form of folk songs, folk dance and others folk art forms in the Northern Delta. It is a form of storytelling, taking the stage and actors as a means of communication with the public, and can be impromptu. Chèo has no fixed structure with acts in a drama as in the European stage, where performers are often flexible. Therefore, the length of the play depends on the inspiration of the artist or the audience's request. Conversely to the opera that forces artists to memorize each word and sing followed by the conductor, artists are allowed to freely modify and play as long as expressing the emotions of the character.

Chèo has three characteristics, namely, folk songs were written into the plays, the language (the way of using techniques of art mobilized) and the character images. 

The art features consist of dramatic elements, narrative techniques, character expressions, conventions and stylistics. The language has its parts using traditional Chinese verses, stanzas, or folk songs with a very liberal, free-flowing eight-word distich metre lyrical form. Chèo also uses traditional Vietnamese poetry verses such as lục bát.

Chèo works in ensembles called as "gánh hát" or "phường chèo", and be managed by all aspects by a single person. During village festivals, summer vacation, Tet's holiday,  ensembles performs from village to village, this commune to the other, serving farmers working on a square mats in the middle of the village square.

Content of plays
In terms of content, unlikely as Tuồng praised the heroic actions of the noble elites, Chèo also depicts the simple life of rural people, praises the noble qualities of man. Lyrical content is always attached to Chèo, expressing human emotions, reflecting the common interests of humanity such as love, friendship and love.

Stories of plays is from fairy tales, stories written in chữ Nôm, the former writing script for Vietnamese, rise to theatrical art of real value and deep thought. In Chèo, the good usually wins the evil; the warm-hearted, gentle students always promoted to the mandarin and his faithful wife finally reunite with her husband. The plays often show off funny things, the bad habits of life such as in "Thầy mù", "Hương câm", "Đồ điếc", "Quan Âm Thị Kính", and also express humanity, as in "Trương Viên".

Characters
Characters in Chèo are usually normative, standardized and stereotyped. The personality of the character does not change in different plays. Chèo's surrogate characters can be swapped and reassembled in any play so they almost have no name. They can be teachers, rich people, the prime minister, students, clowns, etc. However, there also have some recurring characters such as Thiệt Thê, Thị Kính, Thị Mầu, and Súy Vân becoming characters of their own personalities coming from colloquial conception.

"Hề chèo" ( Parody guy) is a character often seen in Chèo performances. Hề is allowed to freely ridicule people the clowns in the palace of the king of Europe. Clown scenes hide meanings which helps people to attack the bad habits of feudal society, including the king, mandarin, anyone who have rights and property in the village. There are two main types of clowns: short-shirted clown and long-shirted clown, or clown without a cane and clown with a cane.

Musical instruments used
Chèo uses at least three string musical instruments including đàn nguyệt, đàn nhị, and đàn bầu simultaneously adding flutes. In addition, the musicians have also to use drums and cymbals. The percussion consist of there are big drum, small drum, cylindrical drum, gong, bamboo tocsin. The small drum is used to keep the pace of singing, for the dances and for the notable sings. There is a saying "without drum, without Chèo" indicates the importance of the drum in a Chèo performance. In modern Chèo, other instruments are used to enrich the accompaniment such as the đàn tranh, sáo and so on.

See also
Hát tuồng
Cải lương
Music of Vietnam
Culture of Vietnam
History of Vietnam
Vietnamese theatre

References

External links 
Tran Van Khe/Nguyen Thuyet Phong. "Vietnam, V, vi:Theater." The New Grove Dictionary of Music and Musicians online.
Giữ gìn, phát huy bản sắc văn hóa nghệ thuật chèo 24/01/2012 | 19:19:00

Vietnamese traditional theatre
Vietnamese music
Dance in Vietnam